Dutta Vs Dutta is a 2012 Indian Bengali film directed by Anjan Dutt. This is Anjan Dutt's semi-autobiographical film. Most of the film has been shot in a house of Amherst Street in Kolkata. Anjan has described this house resonated feel of his old house of Beniapukur.

The film received mixed reviews. According to Anandabazar Patrika reviewer Sangeeta Bandopadhyay, this was Anjan Dutt's best film. This opinion was shared by another Bengali newspaper Ei Samay. However, The Times of India said that "the plot comes across as a total mishmash and therefore, loses punch".

Plot 
Biren Dutta is a lawyer. He is unsuccessful in his career and does not have any client. His wife is an alcoholic.The couple have one son and one daughter. Biren Dutta has an extra-marital affair with his only client.
Biren's daughter China first falls in love with Ghenti Kaku, who is of her father's age, and later, with a guy who is involved with Naxalite movement. She runs away with the latter without the permission of her parents.
Biren's teenaged son, Rono, comes back from boarding school since Biren can no longer afford pay school fees. Biren wants Rono to be a barrister but Rono wants to become an actor. Biren's father starts a music school in the house. China comes back with her Naxal husband and is accepted by her father. The couple later settle in the US. One of Rono's Naxalite friends takes shelter in the house to evade the police. Biren, unaware of this, has an altercation with the police when they come to the house searching for the boy. The police take him away to a police station, where he is beaten up, and drop him home 3 days later. Biren suffers a major setback and stops talking to anyone. In the end, Rono gets a role in a film by Mrinal Sen (Anjan Dutta's first film was also with Mrinal Sen). The film ends on that positive note.

Credit

Cast 
 Anjan Dutt as Biren Dutta
 Ronodeep Bose as Rono (Biren Dutta's teenage son)
 Arpita Chatterjee as China (Biren Dutta's daughter)
 Rita Koiral as Rita (Biren Dutta's wife)
 Kaushik Sen the Naxalite (China's husband)
 Shankar Chakraborty as Ghenti Kaku
 Deepankar De as grandfather
 Roopa Ganguly as Runu
Somak Ghosh (RJ Somak) as Doi 
 Parno Mittra as Nandita aka. Diana
 Srijit Mukherji as Tony Mukherjee

Crew 
 Writer and Director: Anjan Dutt
 Production:
 Producers: Purnendu Roy, Nilakhi Roy
 Co producer: Genesis Hospital
 Executive producer: Sanjay Pathak
 Music director: Neel Dutt
 Editor: Arghyakamal Mitra
 Production controller: Bipin Mukherjee
 Costume design: Chanda Dutt
 Graphic design: Arnab Dasgupta

Filming 
In this film director Anjan Dutt has tried to revive Calcutta of the 1970s, a period when the city evidenced emergence of rock music bands, the arrival of Hippie culture and also the Naxalite movement. In an interview he told–
Unlike other films which have the shade of the Naxalite violence, Dutta Vs Dutta has taken a different direction. I have tried to recapture the turbulent College Street, the pub culture of Park Street and the emergence of Gautam Chattopadhyay.

Arpita Paul gave full credit to the director for the realistic portrayal of her character. She told– "It is a very different kind of movie by Anjanda with realistic elements that would help the audience to relate to the period and the characters... "

Indraneil Sengupta, another actor of the film told– "Everybody in the cast acted their part to bring back that era, which rocked Kolkata and neighbourhood, about which we heard so many things, alive."

Critical reception 

The film received positive reviews. According to Anandabazar Patrika critic Sangeeta Bandopadhyay, this was Anjan Dutt's best film. This opinion was supported by another Bengali newspaper Ei Samay too. Anandabazar Patrika gave the film 9 out of 10. The Times of India gave it 3 stars out of 5 stars.

Songs

References

External links 

 
 

2012 films
Films set in Kolkata
Films directed by Anjan Dutt
Films about Naxalism
Indian biographical films
Bengali-language Indian films
2010s Bengali-language films